Rachael Elaine Harris (born January 12, 1968) is an American actress and comedian. She is known for her numerous acting roles, such as starring as Dr. Linda Martin in Lucifer, her role in the Diary of a Wimpy Kid film series, and as a guest star on numerous TV shows.

Career

Stage
Harris performed with the Los Angeles improvisational comedy troupe The Groundlings and taught for a time with The Groundlings school.

Off-Broadway, she performed in Love, Loss, and What I Wore.

Television

She debuted on television on SeaQuest DSV in 1993. After an appearance on Star Trek: Voyager in 1997, Harris went on to a recurring role in The WB's Sister, Sister. Other television credits include a stint as a correspondent for The Daily Show's 2002–2003 season, as well as guest roles on The Sarah Silverman Program, Reno 911!, The West Wing, The Good Guys, Friends, The Office, Curb Your Enthusiasm, Monk, CSI: Crime Scene Investigation, and Desperate Housewives in November 2008. Harris played the supporting role of Kevyn Shecket, Kirstie Alley's personal makeup artist, on the Showtime series Fat Actress in 2005–2009. She also appeared in Suits as Sheila Sazs, Louis Litt's on-and-off again love interest, and played Cooper in the ABC sitcom Notes from the Underbelly.

Harris hosted Smoking Gun TV in 2004, and has made multiple appearances on such VH1 documentaries as I Love the '80s, I Love the '90s, and Best Week Ever. On ABC's Cougar Town, she played Shanna, a woman that the network describes as being the "nemesis" of Jules. Also on ABC, she made a guest appearance in the Modern Family episode "Caught in the Act" as Amelia, a restaurateur and mother to a playmate of Lily Pritchett.

In March 2014, Harris began a new role in the very short-lived series Surviving Jack with Chris Meloni. In March 2015, Harris was cast as Linda, Lucifer's therapist in the Netflix original series Lucifer.

In 2018, Harris appeared alongside Cheryl Hines on the reality series Hell's Kitchen where they both sat in the blue team's chef's table in the episode "Hell Freezes Over".

Feature films
She debuted on film in the 1992 film Treehouse Trolls as the Treehouse Mom. Harris recalls the experience, "But Treehouse Trolls, that just came out of an audition in this shitty theater. Like, it wasn't even a theater. It was a room. Near Times Square. And I was like, "I hope this is a legitimate audition. I could be going in for a porn. I don't know"." 
Her film credits include roles in Best in Show, A Mighty Wind, For Your Consideration, Kicking & Screaming, and Daddy Day Care. In the 2009 comedy The Hangover, she plays Melissa, the domineering, abusive girlfriend to Ed Helms's character Stu. She previously co-starred with Helms on The Daily Show. From 2010 to 2012, she played Susan Heffley in the original Diary of a Wimpy Kid film trilogy.

Advertisements
Harris' TV commercial work includes ads for Dinty Moore, Avis, Expedia, Quaker Oats, T-Mobile, GEICO, and a Super Bowl commercial for the 2010 Census. She is the voice of turtle Karolyn Slowsky in the Comcast Slowskys television commercials.

Personal life
Harris was born in Worthington, Ohio. She graduated from Worthington High School in 1986 and Otterbein College in 1989, earning a Bachelor of Fine Arts in theatre.

Harris and violinist Christian Hebel eloped on April 30, 2015 and married in New York City. They have two children.
Harris filed for divorce from Hebel in 2019.

Filmography

References

External links

 
 

1968 births
20th-century American actresses
21st-century American actresses
Living people
Actresses from Ohio
American women comedians
American film actresses
American voice actresses
American television actresses
Otterbein University alumni
People from Worthington, Ohio
Comedians from Ohio
20th-century American comedians
21st-century American comedians